Gary Anthony Voce (born November 24, 1965) is a retired American-Jamaican basketball player. He played collegiately at the University of Notre Dame.

A 6'9" and 240 lb forward, Voce had two stints with the Cleveland Cavaliers. He was a member of the team for three months during the 1988–89 season but did not appear in a regular season game. The following season he played in one regular season game for the Cavaliers in a 100–92 road loss against the Washington Bullets on November 10, 1989. He scored 2 points in 4 minutes. In 1990, he played for the Westside Melbourne Saints in the National Basketball League (NBL).

Notes

External links
 Career stats at basketball-reference.com

1965 births
Living people
American men's basketball players
Cleveland Cavaliers players
Fargo-Moorhead Fever players
Jamaican men's basketball players
Notre Dame Fighting Irish men's basketball players
Power forwards (basketball)
Rapid City Thrillers players
Tulsa Fast Breakers players
Undrafted National Basketball Association players